A Single Man is the twelfth studio album by English musician Elton John. Released in 1978, it is the first album for which Gary Osborne replaced Bernie Taupin as lyricist. It is also the first of two (the second being Victim of Love) John albums that, on the original cut, have no tracks co-written by Taupin.

Production
A Single Man is the first of Elton John's albums to not include work by lyricist Bernie Taupin, and the first since his debut Empty Sky without producer Gus Dudgeon. The returning members of his band are percussionist Ray Cooper and guitarist Davey Johnstone; the latter played on only one song on the album. Paul Buckmaster would not appear on another Elton John album until Made in England. Unlike previous compositions in which lyrics came first, John started writing melodies at a piano, and an album unintentionally came about from this. This is also John's first album on which he sings in a lower register. "Song for Guy" was written as a tribute to Guy Burchett, a young messenger employed by John's record label Rocket Records, who was killed in a motorcycle accident.

The staff and players of Watford Football Club, of which John was chairman at the time, provide backing vocals on "Big Dipper" and "Georgia". Also featured on these tracks are the backing vocals of the female staff from Rocket Records, credited as 'The South Audley Street Girls' Choir'.

The photo for the front cover was taken in the Long Walk, which is part of Windsor Great Park in Berkshire. The inside cover shows John in a Jaguar XK140 FHC. John stopped wearing his trademark glasses in public for a period during the late 1970s, and the album photo reflects this.

Release
The album was released on 16 October 1978 by MCA in America, and by Rocket in the UK. 
Singles from the album were "Part-Time Love", October 1978; "Song for Guy", November 1978; and "Return to Paradise", 1979. "Song for Guy" was a near-global success, charting high everywhere except the US and Canada, where John's label, MCA Records, initially refused to release it until March 1979.

A Single Man was John's first album ever to be officially released in the former USSR, though his previous releases had been smuggled into the country in various forms. It was released following the success of his A Single Man in Concert shows in Moscow and Leningrad, though it differed in two ways from its release elsewhere. Firstly, the album was re-titled Poyot Elton John ["Elton John sings" in Russian]. Secondly, on some prints, both "Big Dipper" and "Part-Time Love" were removed, due to the subject matter of the songs. Curiously, John had performed "Part-Time Love" at the USSR shows without objection from Soviet officials.

Reception

In the US, A Single Man was certified gold in October 1978 and platinum in November of the same year by the RIAA. As with many of John's releases of the late 1970s and the 1980s, it received generally mixed reviews from critics.

Later releases
The 1998 reissue has five bonus tracks, the first two being the 1978 flop single "Ego" and its B-side "Flinstone Boy". The next two tracks are the B-sides of "Part-Time Love" and "Song for Guy" ("I Cry at Night" and "Lovesick" respectively), and the last track, "Strangers", originally B-side of his 1979 disco-album title track, "Victim of Love". Some releases of his 1980 album, 21 at 33, also have "Strangers" as a bonus track.

Promotion and live performances
At the time of release, John performed some songs from the album on shows such as Bruce Forsyth's Big Night (performing "Part-Time Love"), Countdown (miming "Georgia" and "Madness"), The Old Grey Whistle Test (performing "Shooting Star" and "Song for Guy"), The Morecambe & Wise Show (performing "Shine on Through"), Parkinson (performing "Song for Guy"), Rockpop (miming "Return to Paradise" and "Part-Time Love") and Top of the Pops (miming "Part-Time Love" and performing "Song for Guy"). He performed two solo sets: one for MCA personnel at the Century Plaza Hotel on 14 October 1978 (performing "Shine on Through", "Return to Paradise" and "Song for Guy") and the other at a RTL studio on 20 October 1978 (performing "Part-Time Love", "Shooting Star" and "Song for Guy"). John's tour in 1979 included songs from the album ("Part-Time Love" and "Song for Guy").

Since that period, songs other than "Song for Guy" have not been performed.

Track listing

 Sides one and two were combined as tracks 1–11 on CD reissues.

Personnel 
Track numbering refers to CD and digital releases of the album.
 Elton John – lead vocals, backing vocals (1, 2, 8), pianos (1, 4, 11), acoustic piano (2, 3, 5, 6, 7, 9, 10), clavinet (3), harmonium (7), church organ (7), Fender Rhodes (8), Mellotron (11), synthesizer (11), ARP synthesizer (11), Solina String Synthesizer (11)
 Tim Renwick – acoustic guitar (2, 3), electric guitar (4, 5, 6, 9), Leslie guitar (7), mandolin (7)
 Davey Johnstone – lead guitar (6), backing vocals (6)
 B.J. Cole – pedal steel guitar (7)
 Clive Franks – bass (1-7, 9, 11)
 Herbie Flowers – bass (8)
 Steve Holley – drums (1-9), motor horn (4)
 Ray Cooper –  tambourine (1, 3–7, 9), marimba (2), shaker (2, 8, 11), vibraphone (5), congas (6, 9), timpani (9), wind chimes (11), rhythm box (11)
 John Crocker – clarinet (4), tenor saxophone (8)
 Jim Shepherd – trombone (4)
 Henry Lowther – trumpet (2)
 Patrick Halcox – trumpet (4)
 Paul Buckmaster – orchestra arrangements (1, 3, 5, 6, 9), arrangements (2), ARP synthesizer (10)
 Gary Osborne – backing vocals (1, 2, 3, 6)
 Vicki Brown – backing vocals (3, 6)
 Stevie Lange – backing vocals (3, 6)
 Joanne Stone – backing vocals (3, 6)
 Chris Thompson – backing vocals (3, 6)
 The South Audley Street Girl's Choir – backing vocals (4, 7)
 Watford Football Club – backing vocals (4, 7)

Production 
 Producers – Clive Franks and Elton John
 Supervising Producer – Mike Gill
 Engineers – Phil Dunne, Stuart Epps, Clive Franks and Peter Mew.
 Mixing – Phil Dunne, Stuart Epps and Clive Franks.
 Mastered by  Ian Cooper at Utopia Studios (London, UK).
 Digital Remastering – Gus Dudgeon
 Coordination – David Croker and Alex Foster 
 Sleeve Design – David Costa
 Graphic Design – Mike Storey
 Photography – Terry O'Neill
 Liner Editor – John Tobler
 Liner Notes – Chris White
 Management – John Reid

Charts

Weekly charts

Year-end charts

Certifications

References

External links

Elton John albums
Albums arranged by Paul Buckmaster
Albums produced by Elton John
1978 albums
The Rocket Record Company albums